Tamgha-e-Jamhooriyat or Medal of Democracy, is a medal that commemorates those who perform an extraordinary service to democracy in Pakistan from the country of Pakistan. The medal has only been bestowed once in the country’s history, when former prime minister Benazir Bhutto awarded it to the then chief of army staff, General Mirza Aslam Beg, in 1988.

 Democracy Medal, 1988 (Jamhuriat Tamgha, A.H. 1409)
 Recipients - Military forces of Pakistan

The medal was created in 1988 to commemorate the return to democratic government following the death of General Zia-ul-Haq in an aeroplane crash and the election of Benazir Bhutto as Prime Minister.

Shape

 Circular silvered bronze medal with swivel scrolls and ribbon bar for suspension.
 Obverse - the face with an inscription in Urdu within a floral wreath.
 Reverse - inscribed in Urdu "تمغہء جمہوریت".
 Diameter - 1.3/8th inches (36mm)
 Ribbon - Original

Service Ribbon Insignia

See More
 1988 Pakistani general election
 Awards and decorations of the Pakistan Armed Forces

References

Military awards and decorations of Pakistan
Pakistan and the Commonwealth of Nations